Yeshivas Knesses Yisrael was a yeshiva located in the town of Sloboda Vilyampolskaya in Kovno Governorate of Russian Empire (now Vilijampolė in Kaunas, Lithuania). It  was known colloquially as the "mother of yeshivas" and was devoted to high-level study of the Talmud. It functioned from the late 19th century until World War II.

Origins 
From the second half of the 19th century, Kovno became a center of Jewish cultural activity in Lithuania. Prominent there were Yitzchak Elchanan Spektor (the "Kovner Rav"; officiated 1864-96); Abraham Mapu, one of the first modern Hebrew writers; and Israel Isidor Elyashev, the "Ba'al Makhshoves", the first Yiddish literary critic. The yeshivot of Slobodka, in particular the Or HaChaim yeshivah founded by Tzvi Levitan about 1863 (also known as Yeshivas R' Hirschel), attracted students from other countries and were headed by noted scholars. Nosson Tzvi Finkel, also known as "Der Alter fun Slabodka" (The Elder of Slabodka), who had also founded several kollelim in the area, served as mashgiach ruchani and introduced Musar ideals there.

In 1882, he combined his kollelim and the Ohr Hachaim yeshiva into a new yeshiva, thus forming the "Slabodka Yeshiva". While Rabbi Finkel oversaw the institution, Rabbi Yitzchak Yaakov Rabinowitz was appointed rosh yeshiva, a position he held until 1893. After his departure, Rabbi Finkel appointed two brothers-in-law, Rabbis Moshe Mordechai Epstein and Isser Zalman Meltzer as rosh yeshivas. Rabbi Meltzer left three years later to head the Slutsk Yeshiva of the Ridvaz.

Division 

In 1897, there was opposition among the students to the Musar method, and the yeshiva was divided into two. The followers of the mussar movement had to move to a separate building, while its opponents founded the Knesses Beis Yitzchak yeshivah, named after Rabbi Yitzchak Elchanan Spektor. Rabbi Finkel, a great proponent of the mussar movement, led the Knesses Yisrael faction, and Rabbi Moshe Mordechai Epstein remained loyal to him, maintaining his post at Knesses Yisrael, despite being offered the position of rosh yeshiva in Knesses Beis Yitzchak.

Despite the rivalry between the two institutions at the time of the division, they ended up achieving a peaceful coexistence, largely due to Rabbi Epstein becoming a posek in Slabodka under Rabbi Moshe Danishevky, who served as Knesses Beis Yitzchak's rosh yeshiva, hence a cooperation becoming possible between the two rosh yeshivas.

World War I 

Shortly after the outbreak of World War I in 1914, some of the yeshiva, including Rabbi Finkel, Rabbi Epstein, and the mashgiach ruchani Rabbi Ber Hirsch Heller, fled Slabodka to Minsk, which was farther from the front lines. When the Germans began bombing Minsk, most of the yeshiva fled to Kremenchug, while a small group remained in Minsk under the leadership of Rabbi Finkel's son, Rabbi Moshe Finkel. The yeshiva in Kremenchug numbered approximately 40 to 50 students, in addition to the teachers and their families. In 1920, the yeshiva was ready to return to Slabodka. They traveled to Minsk and Vilnius before reaching Slabodka, which involved paying smugglers to smuggle them over the Russian-Lithuanian border.

Relocation to Israel

A 1924 edict requiring enlistment in the military or supplementary secular studies in the yeshiva led a large number of students in the Slabodka yeshiva to relocate to Israel. The Alter of Slabodka sent Rabbis Avraham Grodzinski and Yechezkel Sarna to Israel to find a location for the yeshiva, and they decided on Hebron. The staff of the yeshiva in Lithuania was divided between the original Lithuanian yeshiva and the new Hebron branch, known as the Hebron Yeshiva. Rabbi Epstein would serve as rosh yeshiva in Hebron and Rabbi Finkel would serve as mashgiach together with Rabbi Yehuda Leib Chasman. In Lithuania, Rabbi Yitzchak Isaac Sher, son-in-law of Rabbi Finkel, would serve as rosh yeshiva, while Rabbi Ber Hirsch Heller and Rabbi Avraham Grodzenski would serve as mashgiachs. In the 1929 Hebron massacre, twenty-four students were murdered, and the yeshiva was subsequently re-established in the Geula neighbourhood of Jerusalem.

Holocaust 

The original yeshiva building is in Lithuania. Its unique design, in the shape of a sefer torah can still be seen today. The building was confiscated by the communists. Slabodka yeshiva Bnei Brak was reestablished by Rabbi Sher in Bnei Brak.

Prominent alumni

Rabbis 

David Cohen, rabbi, talmudist, philosopher and kabbalist
Tzvi Hirsch Ferber, rabbi in Soho, London
Eliezer Yehuda Finkel, rosh yeshiva of Mir yeshiva in both Poland and Jerusalem
Tzvi Pesach Frank, halakhic scholar and Chief Rabbi of Jerusalem
Avraham Grodzinski, mashgiach ruchani, Slabodka yeshiva
Reuven Grozovsky, rosh yeshiva, Yeshiva Torah Vodaas
Yosef Zvi HaLevy, Israeli rabbi and head of the rabbinical court for Tel Aviv-Yafo
Yitzchok Hutner, rosh yeshiva, Yeshiva Rabbi Chaim Berlin
Meyer Juzint, American Talmudic scholar
Avraham Kalmanowitz, rosh yeshiva, Mir yeshiva in Brooklyn, New York
Yaakov Kamenetsky, rosh yeshiva, Yeshiva Torah Vodaas
Avraham Elya Kaplan, rosh yeshiva, Hildesheimer Rabbinical Seminary
Aharon Kotler, rosh yeshiva, Beth Medrash Govoha
Dovid Leibowitz, rosh yeshiva, Yeshivas Rabbeinu Yisrael Meir HaKohen
Yehuda Levenberg, chief rabbi and rosh yeshiva in New Haven, CT
Yeruchom Levovitz, mashgiach ruchani, Mir yeshiva (Belarus)
Avigdor Miller, mashgiach ruchani, Yeshiva Rabbi Chaim Berlin, and community rabbi
Ephraim Oshry, Lithuanian-born posek, rabbi of Beth Hamedrash Hagodol and Holocaust survivor
Eliezer Palchinsky, rosh yeshiva, Yeshivas Beis Aryeh, Jerusalem
Shlomo Polachek, Talmudic scholar and one of the earliest rosh yeshivas in America
Pesach Pruskin, rabbi and rosh yeshiva in Kobrin
Yaakov Yitzchok Ruderman, rosh yeshiva, Yeshivas Ner Yisroel, Baltimore
Yechezkel Sarna, rosh yeshiva, Hebron yeshiva
Elazar Shach, rosh yeshiva, Ponovezh yeshiva
Moshe Shatzkes, Polish-born rabbi and rosh yeshiva, Yeshivas Grodno
Zalman Sorotzkin, Polish-born rabbi
Isaac Stollman, rabbi, author and religious Zionist leader
Naftoli Trop, rosh yeshiva, Raduń Yeshiva
Yechiel Yaakov Weinberg, rosh yeshiva, Hildesheimer Rabbinical Seminary

Other 

Gedaliah Alon, Israeli historian
Pessah Bar-Adon, Israeli archaeologist and writer
Ezriel Carlebach, journalist and editorial writer
Ben-Zion Dinur, Zionist activist, educator, historian and Israeli politician
Lazarus Goldschmidt, writer and translator of the Babylonian Talmud into German 
Saul Lieberman, professor of Talmud, Jewish Theological Seminary of America
Harry Austryn Wolfson, Harvard University scholar
Moshe Zilberg, Israeli jurist

See also
Slabodka yeshiva (Bnei Brak)
Hebron Yeshiva

Notes

References

External links
 Yeshiva of Slobodka, YIVO Encyclopedia of Jews in Eastern Europe

Slabodka yeshiva
Defunct schools in Kaunas
Jews and Judaism in Kaunas
Musar movement
Yeshivas of Lithuania
The Holocaust in Lithuania
Pre-World War II European yeshivas
Haredi Judaism in Lithuania